Aaron Devone Glenn (born July 16, 1972) is an American football coach and former cornerback who is the defensive coordinator for the Detroit Lions of the National Football League (NFL). He previously served as the defensive backs coach for the New Orleans Saints from 2016 to 2020 and also served as an assistant coach for the Cleveland Browns.

Glenn played 15 seasons in the NFL. During his playing time, Glenn played for the New York Jets, Houston Texans, Dallas Cowboys, Jacksonville Jaguars and New Orleans Saints. He played college football for Texas A&M University.

Early years
Glenn was born in Humble, Texas.  He played youth football in the Humble Area Football League.  He attended Nimitz High School in Houston, Texas, where he was a four-year letterman for the Nimitz Cougars high school football team. As a senior, he posted over 1,000 rushing yards, over 200 receiving yards and 7 interceptions. He also lettered in basketball and track

Playing career

College
Glenn originally signed his letter of intent to play college football for the Purdue Boilermakers in 1990.

Glenn first attended Navarro College in Corsicana, Texas, where as a sophomore, he won all-conference and junior college All-America honors, after posting two interceptions, 60 tackles, and 15 pass deflections.

Glenn then transferred to Texas A&M University, where he played for the Texas A&M Aggies football team in 1992 and 1993.  As a junior in 1992, he was the Southwest Conference (SWC) Newcomer of the Year and a first-team All-Southwest Conference selection.

As a senior in 1993, he registered 27 tackles, 13 passes defensed and led the nation with a 19.2-yard punt return average, while receiving first-team All-SWC and a consensus first-team All-American honors.

In 2000, he was inducted into the Texas A&M Sports Hall of Fame.

National Football League

New York Jets
Glenn was selected by the New York Jets in the first round (12th overall) of the 1994 NFL Draft.
In 1996, Glenn set the team record for longest interception return with a 100-yard touchdown against the Miami Dolphins.

In 2001, he started 12 games, missing 3 contests with a sprained knee. He had 39 tackles and 12 passes defensed (second on the team).

Houston Texans
Glenn was acquired by the Houston Texans through the 2002 NFL Expansion Draft. He started 16 games at left cornerback, registering 75 tackles, 5 interceptions, 16 passes defensed and one sack. He and teammate Gary Walker became the first Texans to reach the NFL Pro Bowl in 2002.

In 2003, he started 11 games and was declared inactive in 2 because of injury, before being placed on the injured reserve list for the final 3 contests. He finished with 29 tackles, one interception and 16 passes defensed. The next year, he started 16 games, making 5 interceptions and 14 passes defensed. He was released because of salary cap reasons on April 26, 2005.

Dallas Cowboys
Glenn signed with the Dallas Cowboys before the 2005 season reuniting him with Bill Parcells, who was his head coach with the New York Jets. Coming in as a 33 year old free agent, he surprised observers with his high level of play. Although he was projected to be involved only on the nickel defense, he started 7 games in place of an injured Anthony Henry and recorded 4 interceptions (led the team).

The next year, he played in 16 games (1 start) and was used mostly on the nickel defense, registering 20 tackles with one interception. In 2007, Wade Phillips was hired as the new head coach and released Glenn on September 1.

Jacksonville Jaguars
On September 3, 2007, he signed with the Jacksonville Jaguars. He played in 5 games (4 starts) and was declared inactive for 11 regular season games and 2 playoff games.

New Orleans Saints
Glenn signed as a free agent with the New Orleans Saints on April 7, 2008. He injured his ankle during the second game of the season, which limited his playing time until being placed on the injured reserve list on November 27.

Retirement
After five seasons away from the Texans, on July 28, 2010, Glenn signed a one-day contract so he could retire as a Texan.

NFL career statistics

Coaching career

Houston Stallions
Starting in 2012, Glenn held the position of general manager with the Houston Stallions of the Texas Lone Star Football League, an indoor league comprising exclusively teams from Texas.

New York Jets
In June 2012, Glenn was hired by the New York Jets, his former team, as a personnel scout.

Cleveland Browns
On May 18, 2014, Glenn was named the assistant defensive backs coach for the Cleveland Browns.

New Orleans Saints
On January 13, 2016, Glenn was hired by the New Orleans Saints as their secondary coach.

Detroit Lions
On January 23, 2021, Glenn was hired by the Detroit Lions as their defensive coordinator under head coach Dan Campbell.

References

External links
 Detroit Lions profile

1972 births
Living people
African-American players of American football
All-American college football players
American Conference Pro Bowl players
American football cornerbacks
American football safeties
Cleveland Browns coaches
Dallas Cowboys players
Houston Texans players
Jacksonville Jaguars players
Navarro Bulldogs football players
New Orleans Saints coaches
New Orleans Saints players
New York Jets players
People from Humble, Texas
Players of American football from Texas
Sportspeople from Harris County, Texas
Texas A&M Aggies football players
Detroit Lions coaches
National Football League defensive coordinators
21st-century African-American sportspeople
20th-century African-American sportspeople
Ed Block Courage Award recipients